Bembecia blanka is a moth of the family Sesiidae. It is found on the Greek island of Crete.

It is the smallest European species of the genus Bembecia.

The larvae possibly feed on Trifolium species.

References

Moths described in 2001
Sesiidae
Moths of Europe